Woo Wing Thye (Chinese name: 胡永泰) is a Malaysian-American economist. He is currently Vice President for Asia of the UN Sustainable Development Solutions Network; Distinguished Fellow of the Penang Institute in George Town, Malaysia; National Distinguished Fellow in the Thousand Talents Program of China; Changjiang Professor in China; and Distinguished Professor Emeritus of Economics at University of California, Davis. He is also Director of the East Asia Program within the Center for Sustainable Development at Columbia University and a member of the International Advisory Council at the Center for Social and Economic Research (CASE); and holds academic positions Fudan University in Shanghai, Henan University in Kaifeng, Xinjiang University of Finance and Economics in Urumuchi, Peking University in Beijing, and Sunway University in Kuala Lumpur.

Professor Woo is an expert on East Asian economies, particularly China, Malaysia and Indonesia. He has written extensively on the middle-income trap, as well as on transition economics, growth and development, globalization, exchange rate economics, and regional economic disparity.

He earned his PhD from Harvard University in 1982 with a thesis entitled 'Exchange rate determination under rational expectations: a structural approach'. The University of Cambodia awarded Professor Woo an Honorary Doctorate in Sustainable Development in 2020.

Biography
Woo was born in 1954 in George Town, Penang, Malaysia. Following undergraduate study in economics and engineering at Swarthmore College, he took an MA in Economics at Yale and later an MA and PhD at Harvard (1982). Woo has been a member the economics faculty at the University of California, Davis, since 1985. He has also worked at the Brookings Institution in Washington, D.C., at different stages of his career, starting as a Research Assistant in 1976-77, then as a Research Associate in 1982-1985, and finally as the New Century Chair in International Trade and Economics from 2006-2009.

Woo has worked as a consultant on tax and exchange rate reform for China's Ministry of Finance and, between 1994 and 1996, led an international team, which included Leszek Balcerowicz, Boris Fyodorov, Fan Gang and Jeffrey Sachs to study the reform experiences of centrally planned economies. From 1997-1998, he was a special advisor to the U.S. Treasury.

In 2001, Woo helped establish the Asian Economic Panel (AEP), a forum of about 80 specialists on Asian economies, which meets three times a year to discuss issues of importance to the region's economies. Selected proceedings of the AEP are published in the Asian Economic Papers, MIT Press.

From 2002 until 2005, Woo was a special advisor for East Asian Economies to the United Nations Millennium Project. In July 2005, he was appointed to the International Advisory Panel for Malaysia's then-Prime Minister Abdullah Ahmad Badawi, and he was an economics advisor to the State of Penang in 2008-2018. He was Executive Director of the Penang Institute, Penang state government's public policy think tank, between 2012 and 2013. Professor Woo has also served at Sunway University as a member of the Board of Directors in 2015-2021, founding President of the Jeffrey Cheah Institute on Southeast Asia (JCI) in 2014-2022, founding Director of the Jeffrey Sachs Center for Sustainable Development (JSC) in 2016-2022, and Acting CEO of the Asian Strategic Leadership Institute (ASLI) in 2021-2022.

Research interests
Professor Woo's research interests are economic restructuring, financial contagion, fiscal crisis, and the 17 Sustainable Development Goals. His research covers China's economic reforms as well as its sources of growth and the wealth gap, which Woo argues has been significantly understated.

Woo was recently described as "one of the world's foremost experts on the Chinese economy," and appears regularly in the media. He is also a contributor to Project Syndicate.

References

External links
 Woo Wing Thye UC Davis Faculty Page
 CV of Wing Thye Woo at CASE Center for Social and Economic Research
 Woo Wing Thye at Fudan University

1954 births
Living people
21st-century American economists
Columbia University faculty
Harvard Graduate School of Arts and Sciences alumni
Malaysian economists
Malaysian emigrants to the United States
Swarthmore College alumni
University of California, Davis faculty
Yale Graduate School of Arts and Sciences alumni